Athletics (Spanish: Atletismo), for the 2017 Bolivarian Games, took place at the Bureche Athletics Stadium in Santa Marta, Colombia from 21 to 25 November. A total of 47 events were contested, divided between the sexes bar the men's 50 kilometres walk.

The host nation, Colombia, topped the medal table (as it did in 2013) with 17 gold medals among a total of 52. Venezuela were the next most successful team, with 28 medals, 11 of them gold. Chile had the third highest number of winners, with six, while Ecuador was third on the total medal count with 21.

The most successful athlete of the competition was Venezuela's Nercely Soto, who won the women's 200 metres and 400 metres (defending her 2013 double) as well as taking gold in the 4 × 100 metres relay and bronze in the 4 × 400 metres relay. The prevented women' 100 metres champion Ángela Tenorio of Ecuador from multiple titles, as she finished as silver medallist in the 200 m and 4 × 100 m relay. Tenorio's compatriot Álex Quiñónez defended his men's 100 m and 200 m titles in record-breaking times however, as well as taking a relay bronze. Carlos Díaz of Chile took a distance double in the men's 1500 metres and 5000 metres, a feat matched on the women's side by Colombia's Muriel Coneo.

Inés Melchor won a third consecutive title in the 10,000 metres. Other women athletes who defended their 2013 titles were Gladys Tejeda (women's half marathon), Robeilys Peinado (pole vault), Karen Gallardo (discus throw), Rosa Rodríguez (hammer throw) and Flor Ruiz. Additionally on the men's side, José Peña defended his steeplechase title, Andrés Chocho the 50 km walk, and Jhon Murillo the triple jump.

Medalists

Men

Women

Medal table

References

Results
Atletismo. 2017 Bolivarian Games. Retrieved on 2018-01-13.
. CONSUDATLE (November 2017). Retrieved on 2018-01-13.

External links
 Official website

Athletics
2017
International athletics competitions hosted by Colombia
Bolivarian Games